Strathmiglo railway station served the village of Strathmiglo, Fife, Scotland from 1857 to 1950 on the Fife and Kinross Railway.

History 
The station opened on 8 June 1857 by the North British Railway. To the west was the goods shed which was served by a siding. To the east was a second siding. The station closed on 5 June 1950.

References 

Disused railway stations in Fife
Former North British Railway stations
Railway stations in Great Britain opened in 1857
Railway stations in Great Britain closed in 1950
1857 establishments in Scotland
1950 disestablishments in Scotland